The 1869 Roslyn by-election was a by-election for the electorate of Roslyn in Dunedin on 12 February 1869 during the 4th New Zealand Parliament.

The by-election resulted from the resignation of the previous member George Hepburn on 9 January 1869.

The by-election was won by Henry Driver who defeated Colin Allen by 215 votes to 89, giving him a majority of 126 votes. In his acceptance speech Driver doubted if the result would be received with pleasure by the Government in Wellington. Driver got a majority of votes in North East Valley, Mornington and Caversham, while Allen got a majority of votes in his home district of Kaikorai.

Results
The following table gives the election results:

References

Roslyn 1869
1869 elections in New Zealand
Politics of Dunedin
February 1869 events
1860s in Dunedin